Paul W. Berg (1934 – August 4, 2020), known professionally as Pat O'Day, was an American broadcaster and concert promoter in the Pacific Northwest. O'Day, born in Norfolk, Nebraska, is probably best known as the afternoon drive personality at Seattle's KJR 950 in the 1960s; he would eventually become program director and general manager. O'Day is responsible for bringing the Seattle music scene to national prominence.

Career
O'Day owned Seattle radio station KYYX (96.5 FM) from 1977 to 1984. From late 1982 the station had a New Wave music format, one of the few commercial stations in the US at the time to do so.

Starting in 1967, O'Day served as race announcer and commentator during Seafair for various radio and TV stations, lastly with KIRO-TV. The television station, however, announced it was parting ways with O'Day in 2013 and he would not return to broadcast the race.

In 1998, a plaquette featuring O'Day with a photograph of him was added to the permanent disc jockey exhibit at the Rock and Roll Hall of Fame in Cleveland, Ohio.

O'Day co-authored It Was All Just Rock 'n' Roll with Seattle writer Jim Ojala, detailing his work in radio and the concert promotion company, Concerts West. (First edition published October 18, 2002; second edition, It Was All Just Rock-'n'-Roll II: A Return to the Center of the Radio & Concert Universe, published Dec 2003)

More recently, O'Day has been Schick Shadel's spokesman in both radio and television advertisements. In 2007, O'Day joined more than two dozen other radio and music industry leaders as a member of the nominating committee of the Hit Parade Hall of Fame.

His story was featured in a 2015 documentary about radio DJs called I Am What I Play, directed by Roger King.

Personal life and death
O'Day had three sons (Garry, Jerry, and Jeff) and one daughter (Kelsey). Although a reputation for excessive drinking hurt him early in his career, he entered Schick Shadel Hospital in 1986 for treatment. He lived in the San Juan Islands with his wife Stephanie Johnson O’Day where he developed and sold real estate.

O'Day set the Guinness world record for water skiing non-stop (on Lake Washington) for 4 hours 52 minutes, in 1959.

O'Day died on August 4, 2020, at the age of 85.

References

1934 births
2020 deaths
American radio personalities